William John Leonard Beel (born 23 August 1945), generally known as Len Beel, is an English former professional footballer who played in the Football League for Shrewsbury Town and Birmingham City. He also appeared for Somerset County Cricket Club.

Beel was born in Leominster, Herefordshire. A goalkeeper, he joined Shrewsbury Town as an apprentice in 1961, and turned professional two years later. He made three appearances for the club in the Third Division, and moved on to Birmingham City in January 1965 as cover for Johnny Schofield. Beel played only once for Birmingham's first team. With relegation from the First Division already confirmed, he turned out in the penultimate game of the 1964–65 season, at home to Blackburn Rovers, a game which finished as a 5–5 draw. Released soon afterwards, he spent two seasons as a regular with Southern League club Bath City before joining Shifnal Town.

In June 1969, Beel made his only major appearance as a cricketer, making 1 not out and taking 0/18 from 2 overs for Somerset in a Sunday League match against Warwickshire at Edgbaston.

References

1945 births
Living people
People from Leominster
Sportspeople from Herefordshire
English footballers
Association football goalkeepers
Shrewsbury Town F.C. players
Birmingham City F.C. players
Bath City F.C. players
English Football League players
Southern Football League players
English cricketers
Somerset cricketers
Wiltshire cricketers